Kabul was the capital of the great Hindu Shahi kings. Afghanistan was a great center of Vedic culture. There were many Hindu temples in Afghanistan.  Some temples in Kabul have survived the recent turmoil.

List of Hindu temples in Kabul
In Kabul, there are several Hindu temples:
 Asamai Hindu temple, Old city, Dargaa, Asamayi: The Asamai temple is at the foothills of  the central hill Asamayi (Koh-i-Asamayi) of the Afghan capital. The hill is named Asamai after Asha, the goddess of hope said to be present on the hilltop since ancient times. The Akhand Jyoti (continuous fire) there has been burning uninterrupted for many centuries. The temple and the Jyoti have survived numerous conflicts in Kabul and are reminders of Afghanistan under the Hindu Shahi kings. The Asamai temples of New York, Maryland  London, Faridabad, Frankfurt Cologne and Amsterdam Belgium are named after the famous Kabul temple. 
 Baba Jothi Sorup Mandir, Darwaza Lahuri
 Bhairo Mandir, Shor Bazaar
 Guru Hari Rai Gurudwara, Shor Bazaar 
 Mangalwar Mandir, Shor Bazaar

Hindu temples in Kandahar
In Kandahar, there were Hindu temples in Shikarpuri Bazaar, Kabuli Bazaar and Jhampeer Sahib (near Sarpooza) and Devi-dwara (near Dand).

Hindu temples in other cities of Afghanistan
There have also been Hindu temples and Gurudwaras at Chasma Sahib, Sultanpur, Jalalabad, Ghazni, Helmand (Lashkerga).

Hindus of Afghanistan
The main Hindu residents of Afghanistan have been Mohyals, Khatris and Aroras, some other communities like Bhatias, and Brahmins other than Mohyals have also been present there.

See also
Hindu and Buddhist heritage of Afghanistan
Hinduism in Afghanistan
List of Hindu temples all over the world
Hindu Temples outside of India

References

Sources

External links
List of Hindu/Sikh temples in Afghanistan
Asamai Temple, Kabul
Navratri in Afghanistan

Hinduism in Kabul
Hinduism in South Asia
Hindu temples in Afghanistan
Religious buildings and structures in Kabul

Hinduism in Afghanistan